Jeremy Mark Berg was founding director of the University of Pittsburgh Institute for Personalized Medicine. He  holds positions as Associate Senior Vice Chancellor for Science Strategy and Planning and Professor of Computational and Systems Biology at the University of Pittsburgh. From 2016 - 2019, Berg was editor in chief of the Science journals.

Education 
Berg earned his bachelor's and master's degrees from Stanford University where he did research with Lubert Stryer. He attained his Ph.D. under Richard H. Holm at Harvard University. He then completed a post-doctoral fellowship with Carl Pabo in biophysics at the Johns Hopkins School of Medicine.

Career 
Previously, Berg served as director of the National Institute of General Medical Sciences (NIGMS) at the National Institutes of Health (NIH). He was also formerly a professor at Johns Hopkins School of Medicine, Director of the Department of Biophysics and Biophysical Chemistry and author of several books, including the textbook Biochemistry. Biochemistry is currently in its ninth edition and is widely used by many universities. He co-authored this book with John L. Tymoczko and Lubert Stryer, as well as Principles of Bioinorganic Chemistry with Stephen J. Lippard.  He received the American Chemical Society ACS Award in Pure Chemistry in 1993. He is widely known for his work on zinc finger proteins including his successful prediction of the three-dimensional structure of TFIIIA-type zinc finger domains prior to the experimental determination of their structures.

In July, 2011, Berg left his position at the NIH to become the Associate Vice Chancellor for Health Strategy and Planning at the University of Pittsburgh and to take the role of professor in the University of Pittsburgh School of Medicine’s Department of Computational and Systems Biology. Berg followed his wife, Wendie, to Pitt where she became a professor in the School of Medicine's Department of Radiology.

In 2012, Berg was elected president of the American Society for Biochemistry and Molecular Biology (ASBMB) where he served in this role until 2014.

Awards and honors
His honors include a Presidential Young Investigator Award (1988-1993), the American Chemical Society Award in Pure Chemistry (1993), the Eli Lilly Award for Fundamental Research in Biological Chemistry (1995), the Maryland Outstanding Young Scientist of the Year (1995), election as an American Association for the Advancement of Science Fellow (2007), the Distinguished Service Award from the Biophysical Society (2009), the Howard K. Schachman Public Service Award from the American Society for Biochemistry and Molecular Biology (ASBMB) (2011, presented in 2010), election to the Institute of Medicine of the National Academies (2010), a Public Service Award from the American Chemical Society (2011) and election as ASBMB president. He also received teaching awards from both medical students and graduate students and served as an advisor to the Johns Hopkins Postdoctoral Association since its founding.

See also 
Lubert Stryer
Carl Pabo

References 

University of Pittsburgh faculty
Johns Hopkins University faculty
National Institutes of Health people
Living people
Stanford University alumni
Harvard University alumni
Academic journal editors
1958 births
Members of the National Academy of Medicine